Cancer Survivors Park refers to a series of parks funded by the Bloch Foundation throughout the United States and Canada. There are parks in the following cities:

 Bakersfield, California
 Baltimore, Maryland
 Boise, Idaho
 Richard and Annette Bloch Cancer Survivors Garden, Chicago, Illinois
 Cleveland, Ohio
 Columbia, South Carolina
 Columbus, Ohio
 Dallas, Texas
 Houston, Texas
 Indianapolis, Indiana (1995–2017; demolished)
 Jacksonville, Florida
 Kansas City, Missouri
 Memphis, Tennessee
 Minneapolis, Minnesota
 Mississauga, Ontario, Canada
 New Orleans, Louisiana
 Omaha, Nebraska
 Ottawa, Ontario, Canada
 Phoenix, Arizona
 Rancho Mirage, California
 Sacramento, California
 San Diego, California
 Santa Rosa, California
 Tampa, Florida
 Tucson, Arizona

References

Parks in Arizona
Parks in Bakersfield, California
Parks in Baltimore
Parks in California
Parks in Cleveland
Parks in Dallas
Parks in Florida
Parks in Houston
Parks in Idaho
Parks in Indianapolis
Parks in Jacksonville, Florida
Parks in Memphis, Tennessee
Parks in Minneapolis
Parks in Missouri
Parks in New Orleans
Parks in Ohio
Parks in Omaha, Nebraska
Parks in Ontario
Parks in Ottawa
Parks in Phoenix, Arizona
Parks in Sacramento County, California
Parks in San Diego
Parks in Santa Rosa County, Florida
Parks in South Carolina
Parks in Tampa, Florida